Chihiro Nakajima (born 24 November 1994) is a Japanese karateka and kickboxer, and competes in the super featherweight division of Krush, where he is the Super Featherweight champion.

As of February 2022, Combat Press ranks him as the sixth best bantamweight kickboxer in the world.

Kickboxing career

Early career
Nakajima made his professional debut against Manato Yasuda at K-1 Krush Fight 101 on May 18, 2019. He won the fight by second-round technical knockout. Nakajima next faced Junpei Sano at K-1 Krush Fight 104 on August 31, 2019. He won the fight by a third-round knockout, stopping Sano with a spinning back kick.

Nakajima faced Tomoya Yokoyama in his third professional appearance at Krush 111 on February 24, 2020. He suffered the first loss of his professional career, as Yokoyama won the bout by unanimous decision.

Nakajima faced Naoki Yamamoto at Krush 117 on September 26, 2020. He lost the fight by unanimous decision, with all three judges scoring the fight 28-26 for Yamamoto.

Nakajima faced Kento Ito at Krush 125 on May 30, 2021. He won the fight by unanimous decision, with scores of 30–28, 30-27 and 30–26. Nakajima knocked Ito down with a left hook in the second round.

Krush super featherweight champion

Super featherweight tournament
On September 3, 2021, K-1 announced that Leona Pettas had vacated the Krush Super Featherweight title. Accordingly, the promotion immediately organized a tournament in order to crown a new champion. Chihiro Nakajima was scheduled to face Satoru Nariai in the tournament quarterfinals, which were held at Krush 130 on October 31, 2021. Nakajima won the fight by a third-round knockout. He first knocked Nariai down with a right high kick, before finishing him with a left hook at the 1:05 minute mark of the last round.

Nakajima faced Yutaka in the penultimate bout of the tournament, at Krush 130 on January 28, 2022. He made quick work of his opponent, stopping him with a flurry of punches in the first round. Nakajima advanced to the tournament finals, which were held on the same day, where he faced Tomoya Yokoyama. The fight was a rematch of their February 24, 2020 meeting, which Yokoyama won by unanimous decision. Nakajima was more successful in their second encounter, as he won the fight by unanimous decision. He managed to knock Yokoyama down in the third round, which proved crucial, as the first two rounds were evenly scored.

Title reign
Nakajima faced the Shootboxing Japan super featherweight champion Yuki Kasahara at THE MATCH 2022 on June 19, 2022. He lost the fight by unanimous decision, with scores of 30–28, 30–28 and 30–27. He failed to achieve much headway in the bout and was knocked down with a right hook in the third round.

Nakajima made his first Krush Super Featherweight title defense against Narufumi Nishimoto at Krush 144 on December 18, 2022. He retained the title by unanimous decision, with three scorecards of 30–28 in his favor. Nakajima knocked his opponent down with a left hook in the last round, which earned him a 10–8 round on all three of the judges' scorecards and proved to be the pivotal moment of the bout.

Championships and accomplishments

Kickboxing
Krush
 2022 Krush Super Featherweight (-60 kg) Champion
 One successful title defense

Karate
IKO Kyokushinkaikan
 2011 All Japan Youth (U-18) Championships -75 kg Winner
 2012 World Youth Elite (U-18) Championships -75 kg Winner
 2013 All Kanto Open runner-up
 2013 All Japan Open Rookie Award
 2016 All Japan Weight Championships -90 kg 3rd place
 2017 All Japan Weight Championships -90 kg Winner
 2017 All Japan Open Technique Award
 2017 All American Open 3rd place
 2018 All American Weight Championships Heavyweight Winner
 2018 All Japan Championships Semi Contact -80 kg Winner

Kickboxing record

|-  style="background:#cfc;"
| 2022-12-18 || Win ||align=left| Narufumi Nishimoto || Krush 144 || Tokyo, Japan || Decision (Unanimous) ||3  ||3:00 
|-
! style=background:white colspan=9 |

|-  style="text-align:center; background:#fbb"
| 2022-06-19 || Loss ||align=left| Yuki Kasahara || THE MATCH 2022 || Tokyo, Japan || Decision (Unanimous)|| 3||3:00
|-  style="background:#cfc;"
| 2022-01-28 || Win ||align=left| Tomoya Yokoyama || Krush 133, Tournament Finals || Tokyo, Japan || Decision (Unanimous) || 3 || 3:00
|-
! style=background:white colspan=9 |
|-
|-  style="background:#cfc;"
| 2022-01-28 || Win ||align=left| Yutaka || Krush 133, Tournament Semifinals || Tokyo, Japan || TKO (Punches + knees) || 1 || 2:56
|-
|-  style="background:#cfc;"
| 2021-10-31 || Win ||align=left| Satoru Nariai || Krush 130, Tournament Quarterfinals || Tokyo, Japan || KO (Left hook) || 3 || 1:05
|-
|-  style="background:#cfc;"
| 2021-05-30 || Win ||align=left| Kento Ito || Krush 125 || Tokyo, Japan || Decision (Unanimous) || 3 || 3:00
|-
|-  style="background:#fbb;"
| 2020-09-26 || Loss ||align=left| Naoki Yamamoto || Krush 117 || Tokyo, Japan || Decision (Unanimous) || 3 || 3:00
|-
|-  style="background:#fbb;"
| 2020-02-24 || Loss ||align=left| Tomoya Yokoyama || Krush 111 || Tokyo, Japan || Decision (Unanimous) || 3 || 3:00
|-
|-  style="background:#cfc;"
| 2019-08-31 || Win ||align=left| Junpei Sano || Krush 104 || Tokyo, Japan || KO (Spinning back kick) || 3 || 0:32
|-
|-  style="background:#cfc;"
| 2019-05-18 || Win ||align=left| Manato Yasuda ||Krush 101 || Tokyo, Japan || TKO (Three knockdowns) || 2 || 2:44
|-
| colspan=9 | Legend:

See also
 List of male kickboxers
 List of Krush champions

References

Living people
1994 births
Japanese male kickboxers
Sportspeople from Tokyo
Kyokushin kaikan practitioners